The Old Town Hall is a historic former municipal building at 90 Post Road East in Westport, Connecticut.  Built in 1908 as the town's first purpose-built municipal office building, it is unusual architecturally for using cobblestones within a design that is, overall, Classical Revival in style.  In 1979 Westport moved its municipal offices to a rehabilitated grade school building at 110 Myrtle Avenue, Westport, CT 06880.

The building is currently occupied by Don Memo, a Mexican restaurant.

The building was listed on the National Register of Historic Places in 1982.

See also
National Register of Historic Places listings in Fairfield County, Connecticut

References

National Register of Historic Places in Fairfield County, Connecticut
City and town halls on the National Register of Historic Places in Connecticut
Neoclassical architecture in Connecticut
Government buildings completed in 1908
Cobblestone architecture
Buildings and structures in Westport, Connecticut
Town halls in Connecticut
1908 establishments in Connecticut